The 2023 Mexican Open (also known as the Abierto Mexicano Telcel presentado por HSBC for sponsorship reasons) was a professional tennis tournament played on outdoor hard courts. It was the 30th edition of the men's Mexican Open, and part of the 2023 ATP Tour. The tournament will take place in Acapulco, Mexico between 27 February and 4 March 2023, at the Arena GNP Seguros.

Champions

Singles

  Alex de Minaur def.  Tommy Paul, 3–6, 6–4, 6–1

Doubles

  Alexander Erler /  Lucas Miedler def.  Nathaniel Lammons /  Jackson Withrow, 7–6(11–9), 7–6(7–3)

Points distribution and prize money

Points distribution 
The players would receive the following points:

Prize money 

*per team

Singles main-draw entrants

Seeds

1 Rankings as of 20 February 2023.

Other entrants 
The following players received wildcards into the main draw:
  Feliciano López 
  Rodrigo Pacheco Méndez
  Ben Shelton 

The following players received entry from the qualifying draw:
  Guido Andreozzi 
  Jacopo Berrettini 
  Nick Chappell
  Taro Daniel

The following players received entry as lucky losers:
  Luciano Darderi
  Elias Ymer

Withdrawals 
  Carlos Alcaraz → replaced by  Luciano Darderi
  Jenson Brooksby → replaced by  Christopher Eubanks
  Richard Gasquet → replaced by  Michael Mmoh
  Sebastian Korda → replaced by  Mackenzie McDonald
  Cameron Norrie → replaced by  Elias Ymer
  Reilly Opelka → replaced by  Daniel Altmaier
  Stefanos Tsitsipas → replaced by  Oscar Otte

Doubles main-draw entrants

Seeds 

1 Rankings as of 20 February 2023.

Other entrants 
The following pairs received wildcards into the doubles main draw:
  Jacopo Berrettini /  Matteo Berrettini 
  Hans Hach Verdugo /  Miguel Ángel Reyes-Varela 

The following pair received entry from the qualifying draw:
  Guido Andreozzi /  Guillermo Durán

Withdrawals 
  Marcel Granollers /  Horacio Zeballos → replaced by  William Blumberg /  Casper Ruud
  Sebastian Korda /  Mackenzie McDonald → replaced by  Mackenzie McDonald /  Ben Shelton
  Feliciano López /  Stefanos Tsitsipas → replaced by  André Göransson /  Ben McLachlan

References

External links
 

Abierto Mexicano Telcel
Mexican Open (tennis)
Abierto Mexicano Telcel
Abierto Mexicano Telcel
Abierto Mexicano Telcel